List of radio stations in the Central Region of Ghana in no particular order

List of radio stations

See also
Media of Ghana
List of newspapers in Ghana
Telecommunications in Ghana
New Media in Ghana

References

Central